Pavel Petrov (born in Minsk) is a Belarusian male curler.

He played on two World Mixed Championships (2015, 2017), one World Mixed Doubles Championship (2016) and nine European Championships.

Achievements
Belarusian Men's Curling Championship: silver (2018).
Belarusian Mixed Curling Championship: gold (2017), bronze (2016, 2018).
Belarusian Mixed Doubles Curling Championship: gold (2015).

Teams and events

Men's

Mixed

Mixed doubles

References

External links
 
 
 Вне игры: Павел Петров — Белорусская ассоциация керлинга 

Living people
Belarusian male curlers
Belarusian curling champions
Sportspeople from Minsk
Year of birth missing (living people)